Mary S. Keefe is an American state legislator serving in the Massachusetts House of Representatives. She is a Worcester resident and a member of the Democratic Party.

See also
 Massachusetts House of Representatives' 15th Worcester district
 2019–2020 Massachusetts legislature
 2021–2022 Massachusetts legislature

References

Living people
Democratic Party members of the Massachusetts House of Representatives
Politicians from Worcester, Massachusetts
Women state legislators in Massachusetts
21st-century American politicians
21st-century American women politicians
Year of birth missing (living people)